Omolade Akinremi (born 13 September 1974) is a retired Nigerian hurdler. She competed in the women's 400 metres hurdles at the 1996 Summer Olympics.

Achievements

Personal bests
400 metres hurdles - 55.98 s (2001)
400 metres - 53.09 s (2001)

References

External links

1974 births
Living people
Nigerian female hurdlers
Athletes (track and field) at the 1994 Commonwealth Games
Commonwealth Games competitors for Nigeria
African Games gold medalists for Nigeria
African Games medalists in athletics (track and field)
African Games silver medalists for Nigeria
Universiade medalists in athletics (track and field)
Athletes (track and field) at the 1996 Summer Olympics
Olympic athletes of Nigeria
Athletes (track and field) at the 1991 All-Africa Games
Athletes (track and field) at the 1995 All-Africa Games
Athletes (track and field) at the 1999 All-Africa Games
Athletes (track and field) at the 2003 All-Africa Games
Universiade bronze medalists for Nigeria
Medalists at the 1993 Summer Universiade
20th-century Nigerian women